Events from the year 1728 in France.

Incumbents 
Monarch: Louis XV

Events

Births
 March 5 – Jacques Beaufranchet, Beauvoisis regiment captain
 October 5 – Chevalier d'Eon, French diplomat, spy, soldier and transvestite (d. 1810)

Deaths
 

 May 14 – Louise Marie d'Orléans, Mademoiselle, French princess (b.1726)
 August 15 – Marin Marais, French viol player and composer (b. 1656)

See also

References

1720s in France